The self-titled (the band was known as Peter Pan at first) album Peter Pan is the first studio album by the Dutch rockband Peter Pan Speedrock. It is hard to find and has never been reprinted since its release in 1997. It is rumoured that Virgin records have destroyed a big part of the printed CDs back in 1997. According to the band in a reaction in their guestbook on their website 1.000 copies were originally produced, of which 700 have been destroyed.

Track listing
"Es Ist Aber Nicht Ein Tor"
"Damn"
"Bad Boy Buddy Bob"
"Astronomy Domine"
"Alligators"
"She's Got A Hole In Her Head"
"Let's Nick A Mustang"
"Trucking"
"Mississippi"
"Loverman"
"Rings Of Fire"

External links
official Peter Pan Speedrock website
 website of Peter Pan Speedroc

Peter Pan Speedrock albums
1997 albums